National Secondary Route 154, or just Route 154 (or ) is a National Road Route of Costa Rica, located in the Alajuela province.

Description
In Alajuela province the route covers Grecia canton (Grecia, Puente de Piedra districts).

References

Highways in Costa Rica